Hero Brinkman (born 29 December 1964, in Almelo) is a police officer and former Dutch politician. He was a member of parliament from 30 November 2006 to 19 September 2012, after being elected as the number four on the electoral list for the Party for Freedom (Partij voor de Vrijheid - PVV). As the number eleven on the list, he was re-elected in June 2010. As an MP for the PVV, Brinkman focused on home affairs, government renewal, police, defence, administrative burden control, immigration, and asylum.

Brinkman repeatedly criticised the lack of democracy within the PVV. For this reason, as well as the PVV's negative generalisations about certain groups in society, Brinkman quit the PVV on 20 March 2012. As a consequence, the PVV's support for the minority first Rutte cabinet was therefore no longer sufficient to provide it with a parliamentary majority, although Brinkman indicated that he intended to continue to support the minority government.

Brinkman was also a member of the States-Provincial of North Holland for the PVV since 10 March 2011. On 22 March 2012, he announced that he would also leave the PVV in North Holland.

From 1985 to 2006, Brinkman worked in the Dutch police force of Amsterdam. As a police officer in the capital city, he was among others involved in riot control.

Brinkman and Harry van Bommel of the Socialist Party alternately write a weekly column for the free newspaper Sp!ts under the title 'Haagse Herrie' ('fuss in The Hague') in which they engage in a critical debate.

References 
  Parlement.com biography

1964 births
Living people
Dutch columnists
Dutch police officers
Dutch political party founders
Independent politicians in the Netherlands
Leaders of political parties in the Netherlands
Members of the House of Representatives (Netherlands)
Members of the Provincial Council of North Holland
Party for Freedom politicians
People from Almelo
People from Beemster
Dutch classical liberals
21st-century Dutch politicians